Ateni gorge is a gorge in the valley of Tana River (sometimes also called Tana gorge) in northern spurs of Trialeti Range of the Lesser Caucasus mountains. It is situated about 8 km south of the city of Gori in Shida Kartli region of the Republic of Georgia.

The gorge has a number of architectural monuments. Among them Ateni Sioni Church of the 7th century, Ateni fortress of at least 10th century, and a small church of the 7th-9th century. A historical town of Ateni was built in the 11th century, but completely destroyed subsequently.

References

Landforms of Georgia (country)
Canyons and gorges of Georgia (country)